Herbert Arthur "Bunny" Adair (23 August 1905 – 10 October 1994) was a politician in Queensland, Australia. He was a Member of the Queensland Legislative Assembly.

Early life

Herbert Arthur Adair was born 23 August 1905 at Wolfram Camp, Queensland, Australia, the son of Cecil Henry Adair and his wife Helen (née Barratt).  Adair was educated at state schools in Herberton, Wolfram and Aloomba and at the Mount Carmel College, Charters Towers.  In 1926, he moved to Freshwater where he resided for the rest of his life. He had a varied career as a miner, canecutter, cane farmer, contract carrier and publican.

During World War II, Adair served in the 2nd Second Australian Imperial Force (AIF), Armoured Division, and 17 Field Regiment, 5th Division. On 15 February 1928, he married Gladys Hannah Down (daughter of the publican of the Freshwater Hotel) at Freshwater (near Cairns). The couple had two sons and a daughter. In later years, Bunny and Gladys would run the Freshwater Hotel.

Politics
Adair served as a councillor in the Mulgrave Shire Council from 1939 to 1946. He represented the electoral district of Cook from 7 March 1953 to 26 April 1957 as a member of the Labor Party. From 26 April 1957 to 1 June 1963, he represented Cook as a member of the Queensland Labor Party. From 1 June 1963 to 17 May 1969, he represented Cook as an independent.  Adair did not contest the 1969 election in which Bill Wood won Cook for the Labor Party.

Missing and rescue
On Tuesday 27 July 1954, Bunny Adair, an experienced bushman, set out from Cape Tribulation to walk 20 miles to Bloomfield to inspect the country through which local people wanted to build a road. He was expected to arrive the following day and the alarm was raised when he did not appear. The police organised search parties. On Friday 30 July, a man was spotted on the beach about seven miles north of Cape Tribulation by Australian National Airways pilot Bob Rowell who was conducting an air search in an Auster aircraft. Rowell dropped a note onto the beach asking "Who are you?". The man responded by writing "Bunny Adair" with a stick in the sand. A note was then dropped telling him to stay put and another pilot did an aerial drop of food and cigarettes. The tug Tully Falls was dispatched from Port Douglas to rescue Adair. Unfortunately, rough seas prevented the tug from rescuing Adair and so an aerial ambulance (an Auster) made a hazardous landing on the beach at Cape Tribulation and Adair walked down the beach to be rescued from there. Adair explained that he had encountered impenetrable jungle about two miles from Bloomfield and had been forced to return to the coast. He had had little food left when the search aircraft spotted him. Adair was flown back to his home in Cairns, described as very tired but otherwise in good health.

Later life
Bunny Adair died on 21 October 1994 in North Queensland.  On 25 October, a requiem mass was held at St Monica's Cathedral, Cairns, after which he was buried with his wife in the Martyn Street cemetery in Cairns.

Legacy
Bunny Adair Park on Lower Freshwater Road, Freshwater was named after him.  Adair Street in Yorkeys Knob was named after him.

See also

 Members of the Queensland Legislative Assembly, 1953–1956; 1956–1957; 1957–1960; 1960–1963; 1963–1966; 1966–1969

References

External links

Members of the Queensland Legislative Assembly
1905 births
1994 deaths
Australian Labor Party members of the Parliament of Queensland
Queensland Labor Party members of the Parliament of Queensland
20th-century Australian politicians
Australian Army personnel of World War II
Australian Army soldiers